Afreumenes longirostris is a species of potter wasp in the family Vespidae.

References

Potter wasps
Insects described in 1857